The Superior Court of California, County of Sacramento, alternatively called the Sacramento County Superior Court, is the California Superior Court located in Sacramento with jurisdiction over Sacramento County.

Courthouses

Gordon D. Schaber Courthouse
The Gordon D. Schaber downtown courthouse is the main courthouse of the court. As well as providing the main trial courtrooms, the courthouse contains the administrative offices of the court (including the Presiding Judge), and the general civil and criminal case processing support services of the court system. The Gordon D. Schaber Courthouse is located at 720 9th Street.

Other courthouses

William R. Ridgeway Family Relations Courthouse
Family law, juvenile dependency, and probate cases

Carol Miller Justice Center
Small claims, traffic, DUI and unlawful detainer cases

Hall of Justice
Civil Law and Motion and civil settlement conferences

Juvenile Courthouse
Juvenile delinquency cases

Lorenzo Patiño Hall of Justice
Criminal cases

Administration
Pursuant to California Government Code § 68070 and the Judicial Council California Rules of Court § 10.613, the Sacramento County Superior Court has adopted Local Rules for its government and the government of its officers.

Officers
There are several officers of the court, including judges, jurors, commissioners, prosecutors, defense attorneys, clerks, bailiffs, and court reporters.

Judges
The current judges are:

 George A. Acero
 Stephen Acquisto
 James P. Arguelles
 Bunmi O. Awoniyi
 Thadd A. Blizzard
 Tami R. Bogert
 David W. Bonilla
 Lawrence G. Brown
 Daniel Calabretta
 André Campbell
 Shelleyanne Wai Ling Chang
 Donald J. Currier
 Dena M. Coggins
 Lauri A. Damrell
 Carlton G. Davis
 Joginder S. Dhillon
 Philip A. Ferrari
 Curtis M. Fiorini
 Benjamin D. Galloway
 Matthew J. Gary
 Steven M. Gevercer
 Maryanne G. Gilliard
 Helena R. Gweon
 Jonathan R. Hayes
 Augustin R. Jimenez
 Michael P. Kenny
 Christopher E. Krueger
 R. Stephen Lapham
 Alyson L. Lewis
 Kristina B. Lindquist
 Deborah D. Lobre
 Sharon A. Lueras
 Patrick Marlette
 Kevin J. McCormick
 James E. McFetridge
 Kenneth C. Mennemeier
 Shama H. Mesiwala
 James M. Mize
 Andi Mudryk
 Delbert W. Oros
 Alexander J. Pal
 Satnam S. Rattu
 Jennifer K. Rockwell
 Michael A. Savage
 Ernest W. Sawtelle
 Paul L. Seave
 Peter K. Southworth
 Richard K. Sueyoshi
 Allen H. Sumner
 Michael W. Sweet
 Jill H. Talley
 Scott L. Tedmon
 Kara K. Ueda
 Laurel D. White
 Steve White
 Allison Williams
 John P. Winn
 Gerrit W. Wood
 Julie G. Yap

Commissioners
A commissioner is a subordinate judicial officer elected by the judges of the Court and given the power to hear and make decisions in certain kinds of legal matters, similar to the United States magistrate judge. Their jurisdiction includes, but is not limited to, traffic matters, family law and juvenile cases, criminal misdemeanors, and criminal felony cases through the preliminary hearing stage.

The Sacramento County Superior Court has 12 commissioners and 1 referee assigned as follows:

Robert J. Artuz - Traffic Trials

Jaya Badiga - Child Support/Domestic Violence Court

Kenneth N. Brody - Felony and Misdemeanor Home Court

Alin Cintean - Criminal Arraignments (Felony and Misdemeanor)

Scott P. Harman - Family Law/Child Support

Alicia Hartley - Unlawful Detainer Trials and Traffic Trials

Peter S. Helfer - Traffic

Gary Link - Traffic

Kimberly E. Parker - Family Law

Dave Shaw - Traffic Trials

Myrlys Stockdale-Coleman - Family Law/Domestic Violence

Martin E. Tejeda - Unlawful Detainer Trials and Traffic Trials

Referee Marlene E. Clark - Juvenile Dependency

Prosecutors
The Sacramento County District Attorney, currently Anne Marie Schubert, prosecutes crimes before the court on behalf of California, Sacramento County, and all cities and special districts within Sacramento County.

Public Defenders
The Sacramento County Public Defender provides criminal defense services for those unable to afford private counsel. The current acting public defender is Amanda M. Benson 

For cases where the public defender has a legal conflict or is otherwise unable to provide services, services are provided by a group of private attorneys compensated by the Court. The County of Sacramento coordinates this process through the Conflict Criminal Defenders department.

Bailiffs
The functions of the bailiff are carried out by Sacramento County Sheriff under contract.

References

External links
 Official website
 Case Index

Government of Sacramento, California
Government of Sacramento County, California
Sacramento